The 1975 Philadelphia Phillies season was the 93rd in the history of the franchise.  The Phillies finished in second place in the National League East with a record of 86–76, 6 games behind the NL East champion Pittsburgh Pirates.  As a result, the Phillies had their first winning season in eight years.

Offseason 
 December 3, 1974: Del Unser, Mac Scarce and John Stearns were traded by the Phillies to the New York Mets for Tug McGraw, Don Hahn, and Dave Schneck.
 January 30, 1975: José Moreno was as an amateur free agent signed by the Phillies.
 February 5, 1975: Orlando Isales was signed as an amateur free agent by the Phillies.

Regular season

Return of Dick Allen 
Early in the 1975 season, Phillies general manager Paul Owens wanted a righthanded power hitter and a first baseman with more power than Tommy Hutton, a left-handed contact hitter. Both Mike Schmidt and Dave Cash lobbied Owens to acquire Dick Allen. Allen had to be persuaded by several of his future teammates that both the organizational and racial climate in Philadelphia had changed for the better since his 1969 departure from the team.

On May 4, the Phillies traded their first baseman Willie Montañez to the Giants for Garry Maddox which provided a bat for the outfield and opened first base for Allen. The Phillies acquired Allen three days later on May 7, 1975.

Fans welcomed Allen's return. On May 14, 1975, 30,908 fans came to Veterans Stadium for Allen's return to Philadelphia and saw Steve Carlton shut out Cincinnati by the score of 4 to 0. Allen played first base, batted fifth between Greg Luzinski and Mike Schmidt and was given a standing ovation when he stepped into the batter's box in a Phillies uniform for the first time since the final game of the 1969 season. Allen lined a two-out single to center, prompting another standing ovation.

Season standings

Record vs. opponents

Notable transactions 
 May 4, 1975: Willie Montañez was traded by the Phillies to the San Francisco Giants for Garry Maddox.
 May 7, 1975: Jim Essian, Barry Bonnell, and $150,000 were traded by the Phillies to the Atlanta Braves for Dick Allen and Johnny Oates.
 June 3, 1975: 1975 Major League Baseball draft
Dickie Noles was drafted by the Phillies in the 4th round. Player signed June 15, 1975.
Rick Leach was drafted by the Phillies in the 11th round, but did not sign.

Game log

|- style="background:#fbb"
| 1 || April 8 || @ Mets || 1–2 || Tom Seaver (1–0) || Steve Carlton (0–1) || None || 18,527 || 0–1
|- style="background:#bfb"
| 2 || April 10 || @ Mets || 3–2 (11) || Ron Schueler (1–0) || Harry Parker (0–1) || Cy Acosta (1) || 5,964 || 1–1
|- style="background:#fbb"
| 3 || April 11 || Cardinals || 3–6 || Lynn McGlothen (1–0) || Wayne Twitchell (0–1) || Al Hrabosky (2) || 44,834 || 1–2
|- style="background:#fbb"
| 4 || April 12 || Cardinals || 5–7 || Mike Garman (1–0) || Gene Garber (0–1) || None || 11,101 || 1–3
|- style="background:#bfb"
| 5 || April 13 || Cardinals || 2–0 || Tom Underwood (1–0) || Bob Forsch (1–1) || None || 13,539 || 2–3
|- style="background:#bfb"
| 6 || April 14 || Mets || 4–3 || Gene Garber (1–1) || Jerry Cram (0–1) || None || 10,626 || 3–3
|- style="background:#bbb"
| – || April 15 || Mets || colspan=6 | Postponed (rain); Makeup: September 26 as a traditional double-header
|- style="background:#fbb"
| 7 || April 16 || Cubs || 3–9 || Bill Bonham (1–0) || Steve Carlton (0–2) || None || 8,294 || 3–4
|- style="background:#fbb"
| 8 || April 17 || Cubs || 9–10 || Ken Frailing (1–1) || Wayne Twitchell (0–2) || None || 6,259 || 3–5
|- style="background:#bfb"
| 9 || April 18 || @ Expos || 6–3 || Tom Underwood (2–0) || Steve Renko (0–1) || Gene Garber (1) || 21,274 || 4–5
|- style="background:#bfb"
| 10 || April 19 || @ Expos || 3–0 || Jim Lonborg (1–0) || Dennis Blair (0–2) || None || 8,154 || 5–5
|- style="background:#bbb"
| – || April 20 || @ Expos || colspan=6 | Postponed (cold weather); Makeup: August 1 as a traditional double-header
|- style="background:#bfb"
| 11 || April 22 || @ Cubs || 7–5 || Wayne Twitchell (1–2) || Bill Bonham (1–1) || None || 6,525 || 6–5
|- style="background:#fbb"
| 12 || April 23 || @ Cubs || 3–9 || Ray Burris (2–0) || Tom Underwood (2–1) || Oscar Zamora (1) || 3,228 || 6–6
|- style="background:#fbb"
| 13 || April 24 || @ Cubs || 1–4 || Steve Stone (3–0) || Jim Lonborg (1–1) || None || 2,323 || 6–7
|- style="background:#fbb"
| 14 || April 25 || @ Pirates || 2–3 || Bruce Kison (2–0) || Steve Carlton (0–3) || Dave Giusti (2) || 5,726 || 6–8
|- style="background:#fbb"
| 15 || April 26 || @ Pirates || 3–7 || Jim Rooker (2–0) || Wayne Twitchell (1–3) || None || 13,120 || 6–9
|- style="background:#fbb"
| 16 || April 27 || @ Pirates || 0–2 || Dock Ellis (1–2) || Tom Underwood (2–2) || None || 14,074 || 6–10
|- style="background:#bfb"
| 17 || April 29 || Expos || 5–0 || Jim Lonborg (2–1) || Dennis Blair (0–3) || None || 5,477 || 7–10
|- style="background:#bfb"
| 18 || April 30 || Expos || 2–1 || Steve Carlton (1–3) || Steve Rogers (0–4) || None || 8,750 || 8–10
|-

|- style="background:#bfb"
| 19 || May 2 || Pirates || 9–5 || Wayne Twitchell (2–3) || Bruce Kison (2–1) || Tug McGraw (1) || 20,257 || 9–10
|- style="background:#bfb"
| 20 || May 3 (1) || Pirates || 6–2 || Tom Underwood (3–2) || Jim Rooker (2–1) || Gene Garber (2) || see 2nd game || 10–10
|- style="background:#bfb"
| 21 || May 3 (2) || Pirates || 4–3 (11) || Tug McGraw (1–0) || Ramón Hernández (0–1) || None || 44,501 || 11–10
|- style="background:#bbb"
| – || May 4 || Pirates || colspan=6 | Postponed (rain); Makeup: June 24 as a traditional double-header
|- style="background:#fbb"
| 22 || May 5 || @ Cardinals || 3–11 || Bob Gibson (1–3) || Steve Carlton (1–4) || None || 9,198 || 11–11
|- style="background:#bbb"
| – || May 6 || @ Cardinals || colspan=6 | Postponed (rain); Makeup: July 25 as a traditional double-header
|- style="background:#bfb"
| 23 || May 7 || @ Cardinals || 4–1 || Wayne Twitchell (3–3) || Bob Forsch (2–3) || Tug McGraw (2) || 9,735 || 12–11
|- style="background:#bfb"
| 24 || May 8 || @ Cardinals || 6–2 || Jim Lonborg (3–1) || John Denny (2–2) || None || 10,293 || 13–11
|- style="background:#fbb"
| 25 || May 9 || @ Braves || 1–3 || Roric Harrison (2–1) || Tom Underwood (3–3) || None || 7,444 || 13–12
|- style="background:#fbb"
| 26 || May 10 || @ Braves || 1–2 (11) || Phil Niekro (2–3) || Gene Garber (1–2) || None || 6,510 || 13–13
|- style="background:#fbb"
| 27 || May 11 || @ Braves || 3–7 || Buzz Capra (3–4) || Wayne Twitchell (3–4) || None || 6,456 || 13–14
|- style="background:#bbb"
| – || May 12 || Reds || colspan=6 | Postponed (rain); Makeup: May 15 as a traditional double-header
|- style="background:#bfb"
| 28 || May 13 || Reds || 4–0 || Tom Underwood (4–3) || Gary Nolan (1–3) || None || 11,634 || 14–14
|- style="background:#bfb"
| 29 || May 14 || Reds || 4–0 || Steve Carlton (2–4) || Pat Darcy (1–2) || None || 30,908 || 15–14
|- style="background:#bfb"
| 30 || May 15 (1) || Reds || 6–3 || Tug McGraw (2–0) || Don Gullett (4–2) || None || see 2nd game || 16–14
|- style="background:#bfb"
| 31 || May 15 (2) || Reds || 5–3 || Gene Garber (2–2) || Clay Carroll (3–4) || Tug McGraw (3) || 24,038 || 17–14
|- style="background:#bfb"
| 32 || May 16 || Braves || 12–8 || Gene Garber (3–2) || Buzz Capra (3–5) || None || 18,710 || 18–14
|- style="background:#bfb"
| 33 || May 17 || Braves || 9–8 || Gene Garber (4–2) || Phil Niekro (3–4) || None || 30,369 || 19–14
|- style="background:#bfb"
| 34 || May 18 || Braves || 5–1 || Tom Underwood (5–3) || Ron Reed (4–4) || None || 25,905 || 20–14
|- style="background:#fbb"
| 35 || May 19 || @ Astros || 2–4 || Tom Griffin (2–5) || Steve Carlton (2–5) || Wayne Granger (4) || 7,049 || 20–15
|- style="background:#fbb"
| 36 || May 20 || @ Astros || 2–4 || Ken Forsch (2–2) || Tug McGraw (2–1) || Joe Niekro (2) || 7,211 || 20–16
|- style="background:#fbb"
| 37 || May 21 || @ Astros || 0–4 || Larry Dierker (5–4) || Wayne Twitchell (3–5) || None || 8,135 || 20–17
|- style="background:#fbb"
| 38 || May 23 || @ Reds || 2–5 || Gary Nolan (3–3) || Larry Christenson (0–1) || Clay Carroll (3) || 36,197 || 20–18
|- style="background:#fbb"
| 39 || May 24 || @ Reds || 2–3 (11) || Clay Carroll (4–4) || Tug McGraw (2–2) || None || 36,165 || 20–19
|- style="background:#fbb"
| 40 || May 25 || @ Reds || 3–4 || Clay Kirby (3–3) || Jim Lonborg (3–2) || Rawly Eastwick (1) || 25,726 || 20–20
|- style="background:#bfb"
| 41 || May 26 || Giants || 1–0 (11) || Tug McGraw (3–2) || Ed Halicki (1–1) || None || 15,693 || 21–20
|- style="background:#fbb"
| 42 || May 27 || Giants || 0–1 (10) || John Montefusco (3–2) || Gene Garber (4–3) || None || 18,735 || 21–21
|- style="background:#bfb"
| 43 || May 28 || Giants || 8–6 || Steve Carlton (3–5) || Pete Falcone (4–4) || Tug McGraw (4) || 15,706 || 22–21
|- style="background:#fbb"
| 44 || May 30 || Astros || 0–5 || Doug Konieczny (3–6) || Jim Lonborg (3–3) || None || 12,566 || 22–22
|- style="background:#fbb"
| 45 || May 31 || Astros || 3–15 || J. R. Richard (4–3) || Wayne Twitchell (3–6) || None || 18,094 || 22–23
|-

|- style="background:#bfb"
| 46 || June 1 || Astros || 5–4 || Tom Underwood (6–3) || Larry Dierker (5–5) || Larry Christenson (1) || 22,278 || 23–23
|- style="background:#bfb"
| 47 || June 2 || Padres || 5–1 || Steve Carlton (4–5) || Dave Freisleben (3–6) || None || 9,348 || 24–23
|- style="background:#bfb"
| 48 || June 3 || Padres || 12–1 || Jim Lonborg (4–3) || Dan Spillner (2–6) || None || 10,047 || 25–23
|- style="background:#bfb"
| 49 || June 4 || Padres || 7–2 || Wayne Twitchell (4–6) || Randy Jones (7–3) || Tug McGraw (5) || 12,443 || 26–23
|- style="background:#fbb"
| 50 || June 6 || Dodgers || 2–3 || Burt Hooton (4–5) || Tom Underwood (6–4) || Mike Marshall (2) || 38,357 || 26–24
|- style="background:#bfb"
| 51 || June 7 || Dodgers || 4–0 || Steve Carlton (5–5) || Doug Rau (5–6) || None || 41,094 || 27–24
|- style="background:#bfb"
| 52 || June 8 || Dodgers || 4–2 || Jim Lonborg (5–3) || Don Sutton (10–4) || None || 41,334 || 28–24
|- style="background:#fbb"
| 53 || June 9 || @ Padres || 3–8 || Randy Jones (8–3) || Wayne Twitchell (4–7) || None || 30,948 || 28–25
|- style="background:#bfb"
| 54 || June 10 || @ Padres || 7–0 || Larry Christenson (1–1) || Dan Spillner (2–7) || None || 15,909 || 29–25
|- style="background:#fbb"
| 55 || June 11 || @ Giants || 3–8 || Mike Caldwell (3–5) || Tom Underwood (6–5) || None || 3,472 || 29–26
|- style="background:#bfb"
| 56 || June 12 || @ Giants || 4–1 || Steve Carlton (6–5) || Ed Halicki (2–2) || None || 3,869 || 30–26
|- style="background:#bfb"
| 57 || June 13 || @ Dodgers || 5–1 || Jim Lonborg (6–3) || Andy Messersmith (9–3) || None || 33,970 || 31–26
|- style="background:#fbb"
| 58 || June 14 || @ Dodgers || 3–4 || Burt Hooton (5–5) || Tug McGraw (3–3) || Mike Marshall (3) || 52,299 || 31–27
|- style="background:#bfb"
| 59 || June 15 || @ Dodgers || 4–3 || Gene Garber (5–3) || Mike Marshall (2–5) || None || 40,959 || 32–27
|- style="background:#fbb"
| 60 || June 16 || @ Cubs || 7–9 || Geoff Zahn (2–4) || Gene Garber (5–4) || Ken Frailing (1) || 9,353 || 32–28
|- style="background:#fbb"
| 61 || June 17 || @ Cubs || 5–9 || Tom Dettore (1–0) || Jim Lonborg (6–4) || None || 6,834 || 32–29
|- style="background:#bfb"
| 62 || June 18 || @ Cubs || 9–7 || Gene Garber (6–4) || Bob Locker (0–1) || None || 20,807 || 33–29
|- style="background:#bfb"
| 63 || June 19 || @ Cubs || 6–3 (14) || Tug McGraw (4–3) || Darold Knowles (2–3) || None || 15,170 || 34–29
|- style="background:#bfb"
| 64 || June 20 || Expos || 7–4 || Tom Underwood (7–5) || Steve Renko (2–6) || Tug McGraw (6) || 33,324 || 35–29
|- style="background:#fbb"
| 65 || June 21 || Expos || 1–5 || Dennis Blair (4–8) || Jim Lonborg (6–5) || None || 28,323 || 35–30
|- style="background:#fbb"
| 66 || June 22 (1) || Expos || 0–4 || Steve Rogers (5–4) || Ron Schueler (1–1) || None || see 2nd game || 35–31
|- style="background:#bfb"
| 67 || June 22 (2) || Expos || 4–3 || Gene Garber (7–4) || Chuck Taylor (1–2) || None || 31,119 || 36–31
|- style="background:#bfb"
| 68 || June 23 || Pirates || 6–5 || Tom Hilgendorf (1–0) || Larry Demery (3–2) || Gene Garber (3) || 34,759 || 37–31
|- style="background:#bfb"
| 69 || June 24 (1) || Pirates || 6–3 || Larry Christenson (2–1) || Jerry Reuss (8–5) || Tug McGraw (7) || see 2nd game || 38–31
|- style="background:#bfb"
| 70 || June 24 (2) || Pirates || 8–1 || Tom Underwood (8–5) || Bruce Kison (7–3) || None || 50,463 || 39–31
|- style="background:#bfb"
| 71 || June 25 || Pirates || 7–6 (13) || Ron Schueler (2–1) || Dave Giusti (2–3) || None || 34,171 || 40–31
|- style="background:#fbb"
| 72 || June 27 || @ Mets || 2–4 || Jon Matlack (9–5) || Wayne Twitchell (4–8) || None || 27,935 || 40–32
|- style="background:#fbb"
| 73 || June 28 || @ Mets || 2–5 || Randy Tate (3–6) || Steve Carlton (6–6) || None || 37,250 || 40–33
|- style="background:#bfb"
| 74 || June 29 (1) || @ Mets || 9–6 || Larry Christenson (3–1) || Jerry Koosman (6–6) || Tug McGraw (8) || see 2nd game || 41–33
|- style="background:#bfb"
| 75 || June 29 (2) || @ Mets || 4–3 (12) || Tug McGraw (5–3) || Tom Hall (1–2) || None || 45,723 || 42–33
|- style="background:#fbb"
| 76 || June 30 || Cardinals || 2–4 || Bob Forsch (8–6) || Jim Lonborg (6–6) || Al Hrabosky (11) || 28,264 || 42–34
|-

|- style="background:#fbb"
| 77 || July 1 || Cardinals || 5–6 || Lynn McGlothen (10–5) || Wayne Twitchell (4–9) || Al Hrabosky (12) || 22,544 || 42–35
|- style="background:#bfb"
| 78 || July 2 || Cardinals || 5–3 || Steve Carlton (7–6) || Ron Reed (8–8) || None || 21,843 || 43–35
|- style="background:#bfb"
| 79 || July 3 || Cardinals || 7–4 || Tom Underwood (9–5) || Bob Gibson (2–7) || None || 16,068 || 44–35
|- style="background:#fbb"
| 80 || July 4 || Mets || 3–4 || Tom Seaver (12–4) || Tug McGraw (5–4) || Rick Baldwin (4) || 55,301 || 44–36
|- style="background:#bfb"
| 81 || July 5 (1) || Mets || 8–2 || Ron Schueler (3–1) || Randy Tate (3–7) || None || see 2nd game || 45–36
|- style="background:#bfb"
| 82 || July 5 (2) || Mets || 10–7 || Jim Lonborg (7–6) || Nino Espinosa (0–1) || Gene Garber (4) || 50,137 || 46–36
|- style="background:#bfb"
| 83 || July 6 || Mets || 8–6 || Wayne Twitchell (5–9) || Jon Matlack (10–6) || Gene Garber (5) || 27,037 || 47–36
|- style="background:#fbb"
| 84 || July 7 || @ Reds || 3–7 || Pat Darcy (4–5) || Steve Carlton (7–7) || None || 25,096 || 47–37
|- style="background:#fbb"
| 85 || July 8 || @ Reds || 1–2 || Gary Nolan (8–5) || Tom Underwood (9–6) || Rawly Eastwick (4) || 28,479 || 47–38
|- style="background:#fbb"
| 86 || July 9 || @ Reds || 7–9 || Pedro Borbón (5–1) || Gene Garber (7–5) || None || 28,789 || 47–39
|- style="background:#bfb"
| 87 || July 11 || @ Astros || 2–1 || Larry Christenson (4–1) || Doug Konieczny (4–10) || None || 16,394 || 48–39
|- style="background:#bfb"
| 88 || July 12 || @ Astros || 14–2 || Steve Carlton (8–7) || J. R. Richard (6–4) || None || 14,520 || 49–39
|- style="background:#fbb"
| 89 || July 13 || @ Astros || 5–9 || Ken Forsch (3–6) || Tom Underwood (9–7) || Dave Roberts (1) || 12,870 || 49–40
|- style="background:#bbcaff;"
| – || July 15 ||colspan="7" |1975 Major League Baseball All-Star Game at Milwaukee County Stadium in Milwaukee
|- style="background:#bfb"
| 90 || July 17 || Astros || 6–5 (11) || Tug McGraw (6–4) || Ken Forsch (3–7) || None || 18,026 || 50–40
|- style="background:#bfb"
| 91 || July 18 || Astros || 7–4 || Tom Hilgendorf (2–0) || J. R. Richard (6–5) || Gene Garber (6) || 24,072 || 51–40
|- style="background:#bfb"
| 92 || July 19 || Astros || 1–0 || Larry Christenson (5–1) || Larry Dierker (8–10) || None || 30,983 || 52–40
|- style="background:#bfb"
| 93 || July 20 || Reds || 11–4 || Tom Underwood (10–7) || Clay Kirby (7–4) || Gene Garber (7) || 44,134 || 53–40
|- style="background:#fbb"
| 94 || July 21 || Reds || 4–10 || Pat Darcy (5–5) || Ron Schueler (3–2) || None || 43,698 || 53–41
|- style="background:#bfb"
| 95 || July 22 || Braves || 1–0 || Steve Carlton (9–7) || Carl Morton (12–10) || None || 20,052 || 54–41
|- style="background:#bfb"
| 96 || July 23 || Braves || 3–2 || Jim Lonborg (8–6) || Bruce Dal Canton (0–4) || None || 28,268 || 55–41
|- style="background:#fbb"
| 97 || July 24 || Braves || 4–5 || Phil Niekro (10–7) || Larry Christenson (5–2) || None || 21,706 || 55–42
|- style="background:#fbb"
| 98 || July 25 (1) || @ Cardinals || 3–4 || Al Hrabosky (9–2) || Gene Garber (7–6) || None || see 2nd game || 55–43
|- style="background:#bfb"
| 99 || July 25 (2) || @ Cardinals || 5–2 || Ron Schueler (4–2) || John Curtis (6–8) || Tug McGraw (9) || 36,127 || 56–43
|- style="background:#bfb"
| 100 || July 26 || @ Cardinals || 9–4 || Steve Carlton (10–7) || Eric Rasmussen (1–1) || None || 36,350 || 57–43
|- style="background:#fbb"
| 101 || July 27 || @ Cardinals || 6–9 || Bob Gibson (3–8) || Tom Hilgendorf (2–1) || Mike Garman (8) || 22,046 || 57–44
|- style="background:#bfb"
| 102 || July 28 || @ Pirates || 5–2 || Larry Christenson (6–2) || Bruce Kison (9–6) || None || 30,221 || 58–44
|- style="background:#bfb"
| 103 || July 29 || @ Pirates || 5–1 || Tom Underwood (11–7) || Dock Ellis (7–7) || None || 33,340 || 59–44
|- style="background:#fbb"
| 104 || July 30 || @ Pirates || 1–8 || Jerry Reuss (12–6) || Steve Carlton (10–8) || None || 43,260 || 59–45
|- style="background:#fbb"
| 105 || July 31 || @ Expos || 4–7 || Dan Warthen (5–4) || Ron Schueler (4–3) || Dale Murray (5) || 13,510 || 59–46
|-

|- style="background:#bfb"
| 106 || August 1 (1) || @ Expos || 8–6 (10) || Gene Garber (8–6) || Dale Murray (4–5) || None || see 2nd game || 60–46
|- style="background:#fbb"
| 107 || August 1 (2) || @ Expos || 4–6 || Fred Scherman (2–4) || Tom Hilgendorf (2–2) || Dale Murray (6) || 17,820 || 60–47
|- style="background:#fbb"
| 108 || August 2 || @ Expos || 3–4 || Dale Murray (5–5) || Tom Underwood (11–8) || None || 16,101 || 60–48
|- style="background:#bfb"
| 109 || August 3 || @ Expos || 5–4 (10) || Tug McGraw (7–4) || Dale Murray (5–6) || Gene Garber (8) || 15,126 || 61–48
|- style="background:#fbb"
| 110 || August 4 || Cubs || 2–3 || Steve Stone (9–5) || Tom Hilgendorf (2–3) || Paul Reuschel (1) || 16,285 || 61–49
|- style="background:#bfb"
| 111 || August 5 || Cubs || 13–5 || Dick Ruthven (1–0) || Bill Bonham (10–8) || None || 19,611 || 62–49
|- style="background:#bbb"
| – || August 6 || Cubs || colspan=6 | Postponed (rain); Makeup: September 5 as a traditional double-header
|- style="background:#fbb"
| 112 || August 7 || Cubs || 3–5 || Rick Reuschel (8–12) || Larry Christenson (6–3) || None || 20,259 || 62–50
|- style="background:#bfb"
| 113 || August 8 || Giants || 5–4 || Gene Garber (9–6) || Randy Moffitt (4–4) || None || 31,026 || 63–50
|- style="background:#bfb"
| 114 || August 9 || Giants || 11–4 || Steve Carlton (11–8) || John Montefusco (10–6) || None || 43,504 || 64–50
|- style="background:#fbb"
| 115 || August 10 || Giants || 1–8 || Jim Barr (10–9) || Dick Ruthven (1–1) || None || 35,405 || 64–51
|- style="background:#fbb"
| 116 || August 11 || Dodgers || 1–7 || Andy Messersmith (14–11) || Larry Christenson (6–4) || None || 33,175 || 64–52
|- style="background:#fbb"
| 117 || August 12 || Dodgers || 6–7 (10) || Mike Marshall (8–11) || Gene Garber (9–7) || None || 36,512 || 64–53
|- style="background:#fbb"
| 118 || August 13 || Dodgers || 4–5 || Burt Hooton (10–9) || Steve Carlton (11–9) || Mike Marshall (10) ||  || 64–54
|- style="background:#bfb"
| 119 || August 15 || Padres || 4–3 || Tom Hilgendorf (3–3) || Joe McIntosh (8–11) || Tug McGraw (10) || 30,601 || 65–54
|- style="background:#fbb"
| 120 || August 16 || Padres || 1–5 || Randy Jones (16–7) || Tug McGraw (7–5) || None || 40,127 || 65–55
|- style="background:#bfb"
| 121 || August 17 || Padres || 10–4 || Tom Underwood (12–8) || Dave Freisleben (5–13) || Gene Garber (9) || 29,317 || 66–55
|- style="background:#bfb"
| 122 || August 18 || @ Braves || 6–3 || Tom Hilgendorf (4–3) || Phil Niekro (12–11) || None || 4,320 || 67–55
|- style="background:#fbb"
| 123 || August 19 || @ Braves || 4–6 || Max León (2–1) || Gene Garber (9–8) || None || 4,470 || 67–56
|- style="background:#bfb"
| 124 || August 20 || @ Braves || 4–1 || Larry Christenson (7–4) || Carl Morton (15–13) || Tug McGraw (11) || 4,704 || 68–56
|- style="background:#bfb"
| 125 || August 22 || @ Padres || 6–5 || Tom Hilgendorf (5–3) || Bill Greif (3–5) || Gene Garber (10) || 13,426 || 69–56
|- style="background:#fbb"
| 126 || August 23 || @ Padres || 3–8 || Dan Spillner (5–10) || Steve Carlton (11–10) || Danny Frisella (8) || 9,578 || 69–57
|- style="background:#fbb"
| 127 || August 24 (1) || @ Padres || 2–7 || Randy Jones (17–7) || Dick Ruthven (1–2) || None || see 2nd game || 69–58
|- style="background:#fbb"
| 128 || August 24 (2) || @ Padres || 6–7 (12) || Bill Greif (4–5) || Ron Schueler (4–4) || None || 17,870 || 69–59
|- style="background:#bfb"
| 129 || August 25 || @ Dodgers || 4–2 || Larry Christenson (8–4) || Andy Messersmith (14–13) || Gene Garber (11) || 20,048 || 70–59
|- style="background:#fbb"
| 130 || August 26 || @ Dodgers || 1–8 || Doug Rau (11–9) || Tom Underwood (12–9) || None || 20,273 || 70–60
|- style="background:#fbb"
| 131 || August 27 || @ Dodgers || 0–10 || Burt Hooton (13–9) || Steve Carlton (11–11) || None || 20,753 || 70–61
|- style="background:#bfb"
| 132 || August 28 || @ Giants || 8–5 || Tom Hilgendorf (6–3) || Jim Barr (11–12) || None || 4,190 || 71–61
|- style="background:#bfb"
| 133 || August 29 || @ Giants || 3–1 || Larry Christenson (9–4) || Ed Halicki (8–11) || Tug McGraw (12) || 5,007 || 72–61
|- style="background:#fbb"
| 134 || August 30 || @ Giants || 1–4 || Pete Falcone (10–9) || Tom Underwood (12–10) || None || 5,663 || 72–62
|- style="background:#fbb"
| 135 || August 31 || @ Giants || 4–5 || John Montefusco (12–7) || Steve Carlton (11–12) || Charlie Williams (3) || 8,884 || 72–63
|-

|- style="background:#fbb"
| 136 || September 1 || Expos || 5–6 || Dale Murray (10–7) || Gene Garber (9–9) || None || 12,925 || 72–64
|- style="background:#fbb"
| 137 || September 2 || Expos || 3–4 || Dennis Blair (8–14) || Larry Christenson (9–5) || Dale Murray (9) || 15,232 || 72–65
|- style="background:#bfb"
| 138 || September 3 || Expos || 6–3 || Tom Underwood (13–10) || Don Carrithers (2–2) || Gene Garber (12) || 15,597 || 73–65
|- style="background:#fbb"
| 139 || September 5 (1) || Cubs || 3–4 || Bill Bonham (12–13) || Steve Carlton (11–13) || Paul Reuschel (4) || see 2nd game || 73–66
|- style="background:#bfb"
| 140 || September 5 (2) || Cubs || 6–3 || Tug McGraw (8–5) || Paul Reuschel (1–2) || None || 32,041 || 74–66
|- style="background:#fbb"
| 141 || September 6 || Cubs || 6–7 || Steve Stone (12–7) || Gene Garber (9–10) || Darold Knowles (12) || 26,554 || 74–67
|- style="background:#fbb"
| 142 || September 7 || Cubs || 4–6 || Ray Burris (13–10) || Wayne Twitchell (5–10) || Rick Reuschel (1) || 30,071 || 74–68
|- style="background:#bfb"
| 143 || September 8 || Cardinals || 6–3 || Tom Underwood (14–10) || Ron Reed (12–10) || Tug McGraw (13) || 22,768 || 75–68
|- style="background:#bfb"
| 144 || September 9 || Cardinals || 6–2 || Steve Carlton (12–13) || John Denny (9–5) || None || 13,764 || 76–68
|- style="background:#bfb"
| 145 || September 10 || @ Expos || 5–1 || Wayne Simpson (1–0) || Steve Renko (5–12) || Gene Garber (13) || 9,216 || 77–68
|- style="background:#bfb"
| 146 || September 11 || @ Expos || 5–0 (7) || Larry Christenson (10–5) || Steve Rogers (10–11) || None || 7,457 || 78–68
|- style="background:#fbb"
| 147 || September 13 || @ Cubs || 1–4 || Ray Burris (14–10) || Tom Underwood (14–11) || None || 13,283 || 78–69
|- style="background:#bfb"
| 148 || September 14 || @ Cubs || 13–7 || Steve Carlton (13–13) || Steve Stone (12–8) || None || 16,294 || 79–69
|- style="background:#fbb"
| 149 || September 15 || @ Cardinals || 6–7 || Al Hrabosky (12–3) || Gene Garber (9–11) || Harry Parker (3) || 9,955 || 79–70
|- style="background:#bfb"
| 150 || September 16 || @ Cardinals || 4–3 (13) || Tom Hilgendorf (7–3) || Mike Garman (3–7) || Gene Garber (14) || 11,239 || 80–70
|- style="background:#fbb"
| 151 || September 17 || Pirates || 1–9 || Bruce Kison (11–11) || Tom Underwood (14–12) || None || 38,085 || 80–71
|- style="background:#bfb"
| 152 || September 18 || Pirates || 4–1 || Steve Carlton (14–13) || Dock Ellis (8–9) || None || 27,093 || 81–71
|- style="background:#bfb"
| 153 || September 19 || @ Mets || 4–3 || Tug McGraw (9–5) || Skip Lockwood (1–2) || None || 16,676 || 82–71
|- style="background:#fbb"
| 154 || September 20 || @ Mets || 7–9 (11) || Bob Apodaca (2–3) || Gene Garber (9–12) || None || 18,863 || 82–72
|- style="background:#bfb"
| 155 || September 21 || @ Mets || 4–2 || Dick Ruthven (2–2) || Jon Matlack (16–12) || Tug McGraw (14) || 52,144 || 83–72
|- style="background:#fbb"
| 156 || September 22 || @ Pirates || 3–11 || Bruce Kison (12–11) || Tom Underwood (14–13) || Kent Tekulve (4) || 13,176 || 83–73
|- style="background:#fbb"
| 157 || September 23 || @ Pirates || 1–3 || Bob Moose (2–2) || Steve Carlton (14–14) || None || 6,445 || 83–74
|- style="background:#bfb"
| 158 || September 24 || @ Pirates || 8–1 || Larry Christenson (11–5) || Larry Demery (7–5) || None || 6,253 || 84–74
|- style="background:#bfb"
| 159 || September 26 (1) || Mets || 4–3 (12) || Gene Garber (10–12) || Bob Apodaca (3–4) || None || see 2nd game || 85–74
|- style="background:#fbb"
| 160 || September 26 (2) || Mets || 2–3 (12) || Jerry Koosman (14–13) || Tug McGraw (9–6) || Ken Sanders (5) || 20,189 || 85–75
|- style="background:#bfb"
| 161 || September 27 || Mets || 8–1 || Steve Carlton (15–14) || Randy Tate (5–13) || None || 27,615 || 86–75
|- style="background:#fbb"
| 162 || September 28 || Mets || 4–5 || Tom Seaver (22–9) || Larry Christenson' (11–6) || Skip Lockwood (2) || 21,105 || 86–76
|-

| style="text-align:left;" |
The August 4, 1975, game was protested by the Cubs in the top of the seventh inning. The protest was later denied.
The September 8, 1975, game was protested by the Phillies in the bottom of the third inning. The protest was later denied.

 Roster 

 Player stats 

 Batting 

 Starters by position Note: Pos = Position; G = Games played; AB = At bats; H = Hits; Avg. = Batting average; HR = Home runs; RBI = Runs batted in Other batters Note: G = Games played; AB = At bats; H = Hits; Avg. = Batting average; HR = Home runs; RBI = Runs batted in Pitching 

 Starting pitchers Note: G = Games pitched; IP = Innings pitched; W = Wins; L = Losses; ERA = Earned run average; SO = Strikeouts Other pitchers Note: G = Games pitched; IP = Innings pitched; W = Wins; L = Losses; ERA = Earned run average; SO = Strikeouts Relief pitchers Note: G = Games pitched; W = Wins; L = Losses; SV = Saves; ERA = Earned run average; SO = Strikeouts Farm system 

LEAGUE CHAMPIONS: Rocky Mount, Spartanburg

 References 

External links
1975 Philadelphia Phillies season at Baseball Reference''

Philadelphia Phillies seasons
Philadelphia Phillies season
1975 in sports in Pennsylvania